Hronis Exarhakos (18 January 1932 – 27 September 1984) was a Greek actor.

Biography

He was born in 1932 in Ermoupoli on Syros. He studied at Pelos Katselis's school. He entered in 1963 and performed his first theatrical play Vila ton orgion with the Rigopoulos-Analiti company.  A year later he made his debut in the cinema with the movie Diazygio ala ellinika by Odisea Kosteletou.  He appeared in 20 other films and played in 60 reviews.  Most of these were the best movies including I kori mou i sosialistria (1966), Gorgones ke Manges (1968), I Pariziana (The Parisian) (1969), Marijuana Stop! (1971), Mia Elinida sto haremi (1971) and others.

Filmography

External links

1932 births
Greek comedians
People from Ermoupoli
1984 deaths
20th-century Greek male actors
20th-century comedians